| music          = Evan Wilson
| cinematography = Zeus Morand
| runtime        = 103 minutes
| released       = 
| country        = Dominican Republic
| language       = Spanish
}}
 La soga is a 2009 action film directed by Josh Crook starring Manny Pérez and Denise Quiñones. It tells the story of Luisito, a brave man who risks everything to find justice. The film is a story of redemption set in the neighborhoods of the Dominican Republic and Washington Heights, New York.

Production
Manny Perez wrote and starred in the film directed by Josh Crook and shot in New York City, in Santiago and in his nearby native town Baitoa.

Awards
La soga has been nominated at Oaxaca Film Fest.

Box Office and Reception
La soga received mixed reviews and maintains a 50% "rotten" rating on the Rotten Tomatoes website. The film's domestic box office gross currently stands at $161,832.

References

External links
 
 

Dominican Republic drama films
2000s Spanish-language films
2009 films
Films set in the Dominican Republic
Films set in Manhattan
Washington Heights, Manhattan